Dmitri Aliyevich Kabutov (born 26 March 1992) is a Russian professional football player. He plays as a right back for FC Rubin Kazan.

Club career
On 9 July 2019, Russian Premier League club PFC Krylia Sovetov Samara confirmed that Kabutov will join the squad for the 2019–20 season. On 2 February 2022, Kabutov left Krylia Sovetov.

On 5 February 2022, Kabutov signed a contract with FC Ufa until the end of the 2021–22 season, with an option to extend.

Personal life
His younger brother Ruslan Kabutov is also a football player.

Career statistics

References

External links

1992 births
Sportspeople from Saratov Oblast
Living people
Russian footballers
Russia youth international footballers
Russia under-21 international footballers
Association football forwards
FC Salyut Belgorod players
FC Rotor Volgograd players
FC Orenburg players
FC Luch Vladivostok players
FC Volgar Astrakhan players
FC SKA-Khabarovsk players
PFC Krylia Sovetov Samara players
FC Ufa players
FC Rubin Kazan players
Russian Premier League players
Russian First League players
Russian Second League players